Cerro del Villar, located in the mouth of Guadalhorce river, southern Spain, was a Phoenician city founded in the ninth century BC or eighth century BC. It was abandoned possibly in 584 BC. Since 2003, there have not been any archeological excavations. Previous excavations were directed by María Eugenia Aubet.

It was declared Bien de Interés Cultural on 9 June 1998.

References

Bibliography

External links
 

Bien de Interés Cultural landmarks in the Province of Málaga
Phoenician colonies in Spain
History of Málaga
Archaeological sites in Andalusia
Archaeological cultures of the Near East
Buildings and structures in the Province of Málaga
584 endings